Tshalunang is a village in central-western Bhutan. It is located 4 miles from the capital of Thimphu but is situated in Paro District. It lies at an altitude of 2388 metres.

Nearby settlements include Thimphu (6.4 kilometers away), Tashi Chho Dzong (5.6 kilometers away), Dotanang (14.5 kilometers away),  Gasila (16 kilometers away), Yuwak (20.3 kilometers away), Raga (16.3 kilometers away) and Usak (20.3 kilometers away).

See also 
List of cities, towns and villages in Bhutan

External links 
Satellite map at Maplandia.com

Populated places in Bhutan